The Bilaspur–Katni line is a railway route on the West Central Railway & South East Central Railway section of Indian Railways. It is one of the hilly railway routes of the Indian Railways and is fully electrified.

The Bilaspur–Katni line has consisted of hilly areas and reservoirs. The route of this line is via Anuppur, Shahdol & Umaria to Katni with bypassing Amarkantak hill range.

History
 In 1886, was constructed the first section from Katni to Umaria which was also known as Katni–Umaria Provincial State Railway.
 In 1891, the construction was completed by Bengal Nagpur Railway Katni branch with Bilaspur–Etawa Provincial State Railway with the extension up to Bilaspur Junction.
 In 1993, electrification was started from Katni to Anuppur.

Electrification
The electrification of Bilaspur–Katni line was done in the year 1995 and its branches was done in the year 1994.

Main line & branches

The Branch line of Bilaspur–Katni Corridor is also known for the coal producer line because of the production of coal is more in Baikunthpur and Ambikapur. and on the other side the production of limestone is also there on the main line.

References

Rail transport in Madhya Pradesh
5 ft 6 in gauge railways in India
South East Central Railway zone
West Central Railway zone
Rail transport in Chhattisgarh